The 2019 Men's EuroHockey Club Trophy was the 43rd edition of the men's EuroHockey Club Trophy, Europe's secondary club field hockey tournament organized by the EHF. It was held from 7 to 10 June 2019 in Wettingen, Switzerland.

Cradiff & Met won their second title by defeating Stroitel Brest 4–3 in the final. The hosts Rotweiss Wettingen took the bronze medal.

Teams
 Glenanne
 Cardiff & Met
 Rotweiss Wettingen
 OKS Vinnitsa
 Stroitel Brest
 WAC
 Casa Pia
 Bohemians Prague

Results

Preliminary round

Pool A

Pool B

Classification round

Seventh and eighth place

Fifth and sixth place

Third and fourth place

Final

Final standings
 Cardiff & Met
 Stroitel Brest
 Rotweiss Wettingen
 OKS Vinnitsa
 WAC
 Casa Pia
 Glenanne
 Bohemians Prague

See also
2019 Women's EuroHockey Club Trophy
2018–19 Euro Hockey League

References

Men's EuroHockey Club Trophy
Club Trophy Men
International field hockey competitions hosted by Switzerland
EuroHockey Club Trophy
EuroHockey Club Trophy